Henioloba is a genus of moths belonging to the subfamily Olethreutinae of the family Tortricidae.

Species
Henioloba bifacis Diakonoff, 1973
Henioloba spelaeodes (Meyrick, 1931)

See also
List of Tortricidae genera

References

External links
tortricidae.com

Bactrini
Tortricidae genera